Nityanand Rai (born Nityanand Rai Yadav on 1 January 1966) is an Indian politician and the current Minister of State for Home Affairs in the Government of India. He was elected in the 2014 and 2019 General Election from Ujiarpur as a candidate of the Bharatiya Janata Party. He had continuously represented Hajipur constituency in Bihar legislative assembly winning elections since 2000 (2000, Feb-2005, October- 2005 and 2010) till he was elected for the parliament.

Early life and education
Nityanand Rai was born on 1 January 1966. The son of a farmer, Rai has been associated with the Sangh Parivar since 1981, joining the ABVP that year as a student activist.

Career
On 23 May 2019, Rai became Minister of State for Home Affairs. Rai joined politics from his college ABVP unit. He was elected for students union President in his college. Rai in the year of 2000 Bihar Assembly election got a ticket and won from Hajipur. He won the seat four times consecutively. In the 2014 general election Rai got the ticket for Parliamentary election from the neighbouring district as his home constituency is reserve seat for SC candidates. He won the election and became a Member of Parliament from Ujiarpur. In the 2016 Bihar Vidhan sabha election BJP has tried to promote him as Yadav Face to lure declining RJD voters. He has been made BJP Bihar President and after the 2019 election, he was made State Home Minister in NDA2 Council of Ministers.

Post held
 Member of Bihar legislative Assembly - 2000, Feb 2005, October 2005 and 2010 
 2014 & 2019 - MP Ujiarpur constituency
September, 2014- August, 2018- Member of Standing committee on Agriculture
September, 2018-May 2019- Member of Standing committee on Commerce
 May 2015- Member of Joint committee on Land acquisitions, rehabilitation and Right to get appropriate compensation for relocation and transparency (second amendments) Bill 2015.

See also
List of politicians from Bihar

References

Notes

Citations

Living people
People from Hajipur
India MPs 2014–2019
Lok Sabha members from Bihar
Bharatiya Janata Party politicians from Bihar
1966 births
India MPs 2019–present
Narendra Modi ministry
Bihar MLAs 2000–2005
Bihar MLAs 2005–2010
Bihar MLAs 2010–2015